The Russia national under-21 speedway team is the national under-21 motorcycle speedway team of Russia and is controlled by the Motorcycle Federation of Russia. The team was never qualified to the Under-21 Speedway World Cup finals. Emil Sayfutdinov is first, and so far, only riders who won the Individual U-21 World Championship twice (2007 and 2008).

Due to the 2022 Russian invasion of Ukraine, on March 6, 2022, the Fédération Internationale de Motocyclisme banned all Russian and Belarusian motorcycle riders, teams, officials, and competitions.

Competition

See also 
 Russia national speedway team
 Russia national under-19 speedway team

References

External links 
 (ru) Motorcycle Federation of Russia webside

National speedway teams
Speedway